Lee Jin-woo (born January 25, 1969) is a South Korean actor.

Filmography

Film

Television series

Awards and nominations

References

External links 
 Lee Jin-woo Fan Cafe at Daum 
 Lee Jin-woo at Ares Entertainment 
 
 
 
 

1969 births
Living people
South Korean male television actors
South Korean male film actors
South Korean Christians